Oddity or oddities may refer to:

Music 
The Oddities (rap group), a Toronto rap group formed in 1998
"Oddity", a song by Eric Prydz from his 2016 album Opus
Oddity EP, a 1998 album by Cold
Oddities, an album by London After Midnight, 1998
Oddities, an album by Bride, 1998

Television 
Oddities (TV series), a Discovery Channel program which premiered in 2010
The Head (1994 TV series), an animated show billed under MTV's Oddities that aired on MTV in the 1990s

Other uses 
The Oddities (professional wrestling), professional wrestling group in the late 1990s
Oddity (video game), upcoming video game

See also 
Odditties (The Clean album), 1983
Odditties (Kate & Anna McGarrigle album), 2010
 Space Oddity (disambiguation)